Namık Uğurlu (30 April 1976 – 18 October 2015), better known as Ankaralı Namık, was a Turkish singer. "Ankaralı" means from Ankara, denoting his musical style of Ankara's ethnic music. He is best known for his songs "Arabada Beş, Evde Onbeş", and "Dar Geldi Sana Ankara".

On 19 September 2015, he had a traffic accident with his wife, in which he was severely injured. One month after the accident, on 18 October 2015, he fell from the 7th floor of his home to his death.

Discography

Collaborations

See also
 Ankaralı Turgut

References

Turkish mechanical engineers
1976 births
2015 deaths
21st-century Turkish singers
Deaths from falls
21st-century Turkish male singers